(born July 6, 1967) is a Japanese actress and model.

She is frequently seen on television, where she has acted in over 100 serial dramas and television movies.

She was the wife of the film director Shinji Aoyama. She co-starred in his film Desert Moon with Hiroshi Mikami, which screened in competition at the 2001 Cannes Film Festival.

Filmography

As actor
 Gendai Ninkyoden (1997)
 Gokudo no Onna-tachi: Kejime (1998)
 9 (2000)
 Gokudo no Onna-tachi: Jigoku no Michizure (2001)
 Backstage (2001)
 Desert Moon (2001)
 Picaresque: Ningen Shikkaku (2002)
 Days in the Shade (2003)
 Catch a Wave (2006)
 Sad Vacation (2007)
 Jirocho Sangokushi (2008)
 Otonari (2009)
 Asahiyama Zoo Story: Penguins in the Sky (2009)
 Inochi no Sanga: Nihon no Aozora 2 (2009)

As voice actor
 Walkin' Butterfly (2008)

References

External links
 Official website
 
 

1967 births
Living people
Japanese actresses